The 1875 South West Lancashire by-election was fought on 6 November 1875.  The by-election in the South West Lancashire was fought due to the incumbent Conservative MP, Charles Turner's death.  The Conservative candidate John Ireland Blackburne won the election unopposed.

References

1875 elections in the United Kingdom
1875 in England
1870s in Lancashire
By-elections to the Parliament of the United Kingdom in Lancashire constituencies
Unopposed by-elections to the Parliament of the United Kingdom in English constituencies
November 1875 events